Muhammad Saifullah bin Mohammad Akbar (born 31 January 1999) is a Singaporean professional footballer who plays as a attacking midfielder for Tampines Rovers and the Singapore national team.

Youth and early life
At the age of six, he started playing football and quickly gained entry into the then called Five Star Football Academy.

Club career
Touted as a prospective football player and one to watch for Singapore, Saifullah participated in the Lion City Cup with Ikhsan Fandi playing for the NFA U-16.

Trialing with Newcastle Jets FC in 2015, their assistant coach indicated that they were interested in a youth team deal with the youngster. However, Saifullah couldn't transfer there as FIFA rules prohibit players under 18 from joining a club abroad unless their parents reside and work in that country. Previously, he had a training stint with QPR along with three other Singaporean teenagers that lasted for five days. Also, he had a two-week stint at Metz, funded by the Singapore Sport School.

On his first-team debut, Saifullah scored a goal to secure a 6–4 win over Hougang United FC in the Singapore League Cup. After training daily with the Tampines Rovers first team throughout the 2015 S.League season, he joined their Prime League squad with the aim of making the Singapore roster for the biannual 2017 SEA Games.

Saifullah joined Young Lions FC after his national service and played the out the remainder of the 2018 campaign. While on trial at CD Tenerife, he did enough to be offered a contract with the club's B team, he however chose to remain with Young Lions for the 2019 Singapore Premier League season due to developmental reasons. Saifullah became a key member of the Young Lions squad that season, featuring regularly at the right wing position under Coach Fandi Ahmad.

International career
Saifullah represented Singapore in the 2013 Asian Youth Games staged in the provincial city of Nanjing.

In 2016, he was called up for the Singapore U19 team facing the Bahrain U19 selection.

On 17 May 2021, Saifullah got the national team call-up by head coach Tatsuma Yoshida for the remaining Asian World Cup qualifiers in June. On 3 June, Saifullah made his national team debut against Palestine by coming on as a substitution for Hafiz Nor in the 65th minute.

Career statistics

Club

Notes

International

U23 International goals
As of match played 8 June 2019.

U19 International goals
Scores and results list Singapore's goal tally first.

Personal life
Saifullah's father is Akbar Nawas who helped him volunteer for early national service enlistment. As a hobby, he plays guitar and sings and supports Chelsea.

Honours

International
Singapore U22
 Merlion Cup: 2019

Individual 

 Singapore Premier League Young Player of the Year: 2020

References

External links
 Dollah Kassim Award: Saifullah targets stint in Europe
 

Singapore Premier League players
Singaporean footballers
Association football midfielders
Living people
1999 births
Competitors at the 2019 Southeast Asian Games
Lion City Sailors FC players
Competitors at the 2021 Southeast Asian Games
Southeast Asian Games competitors for Singapore